The Old Merensky Library on the Hatfield campus of the University of Pretoria is home to the Edoardo Villa Museum.

History 
In 1933, the University of Pretoria decided to build a new library building. Thanks to a contribution of £10,000 from Dr. Hans Merensky, a mining geologist, construction on the design by Gerard Moerdijk began in 1937. Gen. Jan Smuts laid the keystone on October 11, 1937, and on April 15, 1938, the centennial anniversary of the Great Trek, the building officially opened.

Cultural heritage 
The Old Merensky Library was declared a national monument on August 31, 1990, by Theodorus Gerhardus Alant, Deputy Minister of National Education, and was proclaimed a provincial heritage site under the National Heritage Resources Act (25/1999).

References

External links 
 Edoardo Villa Museum – University of Pretoria

Buildings and structures in Pretoria
University of Pretoria
Libraries in South Africa